The Department of Railways New South Wales was the agency of the Government of New South Wales that administered rail transport in New South Wales, Australia between 1932 and 1972.

Management
The Department of Railways was under the control of a single Commissioner for Railways who answered to the Minister for Railways (later Minister for Transport) and replacing the functions of the Chief Transport Commissioner. The first Commissioner was Thomas Joseph Hartigan, who held the position until his retirement in 1948.

Commissioner for Railways

Rail agency history in New South Wales
The Department of Railways New South Wales was preceded by the New South Wales Government Railways, this organisation was replaced by the Department of Railways New South Wales after the 1932 amendment of the Railways Act by the Transport (Division of Factions) Act.

Sample documents showing Department of Railways New South Wales name

See also
Rail transport in New South Wales

References

Government railway authorities of Australia
Railways
Railway companies established in 1932
Railway companies disestablished in 1972
Railway companies of New South Wales
1932 establishments in Australia
Defunct transport organisations based in Australia
Australian companies disestablished in 1972
Australian companies established in 1932